Spiddal (Irish and official name:  , meaning 'the hospital') is a village on the shore of Galway Bay in County Galway, Ireland. It is on the eastern side of the county's Gaeltacht (Irish-speaking area) and of the Connemara region. According to the 2016 census, 35.3% of the population speak Irish on a daily basis outside the education system. It is a centre for tourism with a beach, harbour, and shore fishing. The village is part of the civil parish of Moycullen.

Name
The name of the village in Irish, An Spidéal, derives from the word ospidéal, in turn derived from the English word 'hospital'.

A number of hospital facilities were based in the area, including a famine hospital which was located in Spiddal during the Great Famine of the mid-1840s. While 'Spiddal' is the common English variant of the name, 'Spiddle' is sometimes used.

History
Spiddal like much of the west of Ireland suffered greatly during the Great Famine, with many people being evicted and many people starving. Appeals were made by the parish priest John O'Grady and by A.W. Blake, as a result the board of works employed some local men in the improvements to the harbour in Spiddal.

From 1848 the evangelical Protestant Irish Church Missions were active, establishing the Connemara Orphan's Nursery (Spiddal Orphanage/Nead Le Farrige) in the early 1850s, the home could accommodate up to 90 boys and girls, and became affiliated to the Protestant-run Smyly Homes (and was even referred to as The Bird's Nest, the name of the Dublin home). Following its closure as an orphanage, it became a Secondary School for Girls run by the catholic Sisters of Mercy.

Facilities

There are a number of shops and services in the area. On the eastern side of the village is An Cheardlann ('the workshop' in Irish), a craft village. There is a primary school and a secondary school in the village.

Live traditional Irish music is regularly performed in the village's pubs, some of which double as restaurants.

The village is served by Bus Éireann route 424 from Galway City. The Boluisce river flows south from Boluisce Lake and enters Galway Bay at Spiddal.

Culture and sport
Each summer, groups of Irish teenagers visit Spiddal for three-week Irish language courses. American students visit for the autumn semester each year to study Irish-language literature and culture.

Coláiste Chonnacht and Coláiste Lurgan are two local Irish language schools.

The music group The Waterboys recorded part of their Fisherman's Blues album in Spiddal. They also recorded a song called Spring Comes to Spiddal on their album Room to Roam. The television series Ros na Rún is filmed there, and broadcast on TG4.

The local Gaelic Athletic Association club is Cumann Lúthchleas Gael An Spidéal, with Gaelic football and hurling being the most popular sports. There is also a sailing club in the village.

Notable people
 Mary Bergin, musician
 Ronan Browne, musician
 Thom McGinty, actor and stillness artist
 Michael Morris, 3rd Baron Killanin, journalist, author, sports official and the sixth president of the International Olympic Committee
 Máirtín Ó Cadhain, a post-Civil War Irish republican, writer of modern literature in Irish, and author of the comic and modernist work Cré na Cille.
 Dónall Ó Héalai, actor
 Seán Ó Neachtain, former Member of the European Parliament and Fianna Fáil politician
 Eimear Ní Chonaola Nuacht TG4 anchor
 Gráinne Seoige, television presenter
 Síle Seoige, television presenter
 Máirtín Thornton (died 1984), Irish heavyweight boxer in the 1940s
 Máire Ní Thuathail (1959-2019), television producer.

See also

 List of towns and villages in Ireland

References

Towns and villages in County Galway
Gaeltacht places in County Galway
Beaches of County Galway
Gaeltacht towns and villages
Articles on towns and villages in Ireland possibly missing Irish place names